UDP-N-acetylglucosamine—dolichyl-phosphate N-acetylglucosaminephosphotransferase is an enzyme that in humans is encoded by the DPAGT1 gene.

Mutations in DPAGT1 cause myasthenia.

The protein encoded by this gene is an enzyme that catalyzes the first step in the dolichol-linked oligosaccharide pathway (also see Genetic pathway) for glycoprotein biosynthesis. This enzyme belongs to the glycosyltransferase family 4. This protein is an integral membrane protein of the endoplasmic reticulum. The congenital disorder of glycosylation type Ij is caused by mutation in the gene encoding this enzyme. Alternatively spliced transcript variants encoding different isoforms have been identified.

Chemistry
DPAGT1 catalyzes the transformation of dolichyl-phosphate N-acetylglucosamine from  Uridine diphosphate N-acetylglucosamine (UDP-GlcNAc) and  dolichyl-phosphata, which is the first step in N-glycan biosynthesis in mammalian cells.

Uridine diphosphate N-acetylglucosamine + dolichyl-phosphata  ↔ dolichyl-phosphate N-acetylglucosamine + UMP

The generated dolichyl-phosphate N-acetylglucosamine is modified via sequential glycosyltransferases, forming Glc3Man9GlcNAc2-P-P-dolichyl which is used for glycosylation of asparagine (Asn or N) residue of polypeptides.

Structure 
Despite the challenge of obtaining eukaryotic membrane protein structure, co-crystal structures of DPAGT1 with tunicamycin or UDP-GlcNAc  have been reported in 2018.    DPAGT1 consists of 10 transmembrane segments (TM1 to 10). Three loops on the endoplasmic reticulum (ER) side and five loops on the cytoplasmic side (Loops A-E) connect the transmembrane segments, where TM4, TM5, TM7, TM8, TM9, Loop A, Loop E form the UDP-GlcNAc binding domain. Dolichyl-phosphate (Dol-P) is predicted to bind the “hydrophobic tunnel” created by TM4, TM5 and TM9 within the lipid bilayer. The uridine moiety of tunicamycin occupies the identical binding sites of UDP-GlcNAc. The lipid tail moiety of tunicamycin occupies the hydrophobic tunnel. Significant conformational changes are observed in the C-terminal end of TM-9, Loop A, and Loop E in DPAGT1-ligand bound structures.

Biochemistry
Changes and diversification of the expression profile of cell surface glycans based on the underlying glycobiology have received significant attention from the scientific community. N-Linked and O-linked glycans are the most abundant forms of protein glycosylation and occur on proteins destined for the secretory pathway. Recent studies of cancer immunotherapy are based on the immunogenicity of truncated O-glycan chains (e.g., Tn, sTn, T, and sLea/x). Despite the prevalence of N-linked glycan changes in the development of tumor cells, therapeutic antibodies against N-linked glycans have not been developed. This is likely attributable to the lack of specificity of N-linked glycans between normal and malignant cells. Abnormal branching of N-linked glycans has been observed in certain cancer cells. Altered glycosylation of N-linked glycans in cancers is typically associated with upregulation of ß1,6-N-acetylglucosaminyltransferase-3/5 (GnT3/5), enhancing ß1,6-branching.

References

Further reading

External links 
  GeneReviews/NCBI/NIH/UW entry on Congenital Disorders of Glycosylation Overview